Wang Wenjing (born 1964) is a Chinese billionaire businessman, chairman of Yonyou, a Chinese company specialising in accounting software and ERP software.

He was born in Shangrao, Jiangxi, China, the son of a poor farmer. An excellent student, he won a place at Jiangxi University of Finance and Economics aged 15.

On graduation, he was given a job in Beijing to "develop computerized financial software for the State Council's government offices administration". Aged 24, he resigned and with some classmates started UFSoft with $5500 that they pooled.

As of October 2015, Forbes estimated his net worth at US$2.7 billion.

References

1964 births
Living people
People from Shangrao
Businesspeople from Jiangxi
Chinese billionaires
Jiangxi University of Finance and Economics alumni
Chinese technology company founders
Delegates to the 11th National People's Congress